Uche Innocent Nwofor (born 17 September 1991) is a Nigerian footballer who plays as a striker. He is currently unattached.

Club career
Born in Lagos, Nwofor began his career with Power United also called Anambra Pillars F.C. He left in summer 2009 to go on loan to Nigerian premier league side Shooting Stars F.C. where he played for one season before joining Enugu Rangers.

Nwofor signed with VVV Venlo in August 2011, On 11 September 2011, Nwofor announced his arrival by scoring on his debut for Venlo in a 3–3 home draw with PSV Eindhoven in the Dutch top-flight on Sunday.
 In his first season, he scored 4 goals in the Eredivisie.

On 30 August 2013, Nwofor joined SC Heerenveen on a season-loan move.

On 12 September 2014, Nwofor joined Lierse S.K. on a free transfer, signing a one-year contract.

International career
In April 2011 Nwofor represented Nigeria under-20 team where he netted four goals in five games to finish highest goal scorer of the 2011 African Youth Championship as Nigeria won a sixth continental title in Johannesburg
 and he was named the Goal.com star of the week in the tournament.

In August 2011 Nwofor represented Nigeria in the FIFA U-20 World Cup in Colombia. He was an instant hit, coming of the bench to score two goals in 6 minutes against Croatia, Nigeria was subsequently knocked out by France in the quarter finals in a 3–2 thriller.

Nwofor earned his first full-international cap for the Super Eagles on 3 March 2010 in a friendly game against the Congo DR national football team. He was also instrumental when Nigeria's B team beat Republic of Benin 4–0 in the WAFU Nations Cup.

In July 2013, Nwofor was called up by the Nigerian national team for an international friendly match against South Africa in Durban on 14 August. He scored 2 goals in the 49th and 68th minutes as Nigeria won the match 2–0.

In the first of Nigeria's World Cup warm-up matches of 2014, Nwofor scored a last-minute equaliser to spare Nigeria's blushes against an in-form Scotland. The match ended 2–2. Nwofor made the World Cup roster when it was announced three days later.

References

External links
 
 

1991 births
Living people
Nigerian footballers
Nigeria international footballers
Nigeria under-20 international footballers
Association football midfielders
Nigerian expatriate footballers
2014 FIFA World Cup players
Shooting Stars S.C. players
VVV-Venlo players
SC Heerenveen players
Lierse S.K. players
Boavista F.C. players
AS Trenčín players
Eredivisie players
Eerste Divisie players
Belgian Pro League players
Expatriate footballers in the Netherlands
Expatriate footballers in Portugal
Expatriate footballers in Slovakia
Expatriate footballers in Algeria
Nigerian expatriate sportspeople in the Netherlands
Nigerian expatriate sportspeople in Portugal
Nigerian expatriate sportspeople in Slovakia
Nigerian expatriate sportspeople in Algeria
Sportspeople from Lagos
Anambra Pillars F.C. players